KLNQ (106.5 FM) is a radio station broadcasting a Christian contemporary format as an affiliate of K-LOVE. Licensed to Atlanta, Louisiana, United States, the station serves Natchitoches and surrounding areas. The station is currently owned by Educational Media Foundation.

History
This station originally was granted by the FCC as 971003MA in 1998 as a 6,000-watt station at its current location. It was granted the callsign KNSN as a 25,000-watt station in 2001 and played an Urban adult contemporary format. In 2002, the callsign was changed to KCIJ and its format was later changed to Classic Hits, then Hot Adult Contemporary until 2013 when its format changed back to Classic Hits. In 2015 its format changed to Country music, and in March 2015 it adopted its current Christian contemporary format. On March 20, 2015, North Face Broadcasting LLC closed on the swap of KCIJ to Educational Media Foundation for K222AO—Natchitoches, Louisiana plus $142,000.

106 KCIJ

In 2009, KCIJ began airing a Hot AC format. The station played music from the 1980s, 1990s and 2000s.

References

External links

Contemporary Christian radio stations in the United States
K-Love radio stations
Radio stations established in 2001
2001 establishments in Louisiana
Educational Media Foundation radio stations
Christian radio stations in Louisiana